Askar Ali is an Indian  actor known for his work in Malayalam cinema. He made his debut with the film Chembarathipoo and is best known for acting in Honey Bee 2.5 (2017) and Kaamuki (2018). He is the younger brother of Malayalam actor Asif Ali.

Filmography

References

External links 

 

21st-century Indian male actors
Indian male film actors
Indian male voice actors
Male actors in Malayalam cinema
1993 births
Living people